Tellurobismuthite, or tellurbismuth, is a telluride mineral: bismuth telluride (Bi2Te3). It crystallizes in the trigonal system. There are natural cleavage planes in the (0001) direction as the crystal is effectively lamellar (layered) in that plane. The Mohs hardness is 1.5 - 2 and the specific gravity is 7.815. It is a dull grey color, which exhibits a splendent luster on fresh cleavage planes.

Discovery and occurrence
It was first described in 1815 and type localities include the Mosnap mine in Toke, Telemark, Norway; the Little Mildred mine, Sylvanite District, Hidalgo County, New Mexico and the Boly Field Mine, Dahlonega, Lumpkin County, Georgia.

It occurs in low sulfur hydrothermal gold-quartz veins and occurs with native gold, native bismuth, gold tellurides, tetradymite, altaite, chalcopyrite and pyrrhotite.

See also
 List of minerals

References

 D. M Chizhikov and V. P. Shchastlivyi, 1966, Tellurium and Tellurides, Nauka Publishing, Moscow

Bismuth minerals
Telluride minerals
Tetradymite group
Trigonal minerals
Minerals in space group 166
Minerals described in 1815